The 11th Republican People's Party Extraordinary Convention was held on 30 September 2000 in Ankara to elect a leader for the Republican People's Party (CHP), a political party in Turkey. Former Foreign Minister and Deputy Prime Minister Deniz Baykal was elected as leader for a third non-consecutive time, replacing Altan Öymen who came second. Baykal had initially resigned as leader after the 1999 general election where the CHP lost all its parliamentary representation. All 60 members of the party council as well as the 15 members of the High Disciplinary Board were also elected.

The convention was called after a dispute between the party leader and the Central Executive Committee. The dispute arose after the CHP provincial office for Mersin was accused of illegally recruiting members, to which Öymen responded by demanding the accused officials to step down from their positions. After bringing up the dispute at a party council meeting, Öymen decided that the only way to settle the lack of confidence in his leadership was to call an extraordinary convention with a leadership election.

Conduct

The convention began at 11:30am with a tribute to Mustafa Kemal Atatürk and İsmet İnönü and a recital of the Independence March. The convention was attended by the former leader of the Social Democratic Populist Party Erdal İnönü and the former leader of SODEP Cezmi Kartay. Tribunes were reserved for journalists and observers while the middle seats were reserved for delegates and senior party officials. Observers from the True Path Party, Motherland Party, Nationalist Movement Party and the Türk-İş trade union were also present.

Leadership candidates

Deniz Baykal
Deniz Baykal had initially resigned after leading his party into an electoral wipeout at the 1999 general election. Despite this, he later claimed that he was honoured to be re-elected as the party's leader. Baykal stressed that Turkish politics was going through a difficult time, referring to the disagreement between Prime Minister Bülent Ecevit and President Ahmet Necdet Sezer and the subsequent financial crash. He further stated that everyone should respect the judicial verdict on the closure case against the Islamist Virtue Party.

In his speech lasting 1.5 hours, Baykal stated that the party's tradition of factionalism had to change and peace had to exist between members. He claimed that the CHP could not become the 'confederation of people who hate each other' and claimed that Öymen's leadership had been dominated with good but wrong intentions. He blamed his party's poor election result in 1999 on the 'hypnosis' of PKK leader Abdullah Öcalan's arrest and Bülent Ecevit's subsequent rise in popularity. Baykal was continuously booed during his speech and had to stop on numerous occasions. He further blamed the result on 'political conditions never seen before', such as a sudden rise in popularity for the far-right Nationalist Movement Party. He stated that he did not need to defend his electoral performance, and that the government of Mesut Yılmaz that the CHP brought down just over a month before the 1999 election was subsequently brought down by the electorate.

Altan Öymen
Altan Öymen had been elected leader of the party after Baykal resigned in 1999. As the party leader, Öymen initially opened the convention by claiming that the lack of parliamentary representation had hurt the party's ability to reach out to the electorate. Expressing the need to help low-income families and tackle inflation, Öymen accused the government of having 'no intention of tackling corruption'. He also expressed that the party needed to reform and modernise itself. He claimed that should he be re-elected, the CHP would 'run to power' and pressured inner-party rivals to not damage the party through infighting.

Öymen also denied that the CHP had been effective in blocking proposed legislation prepared by the Banking Board (KHK), claiming that although he supported the president's decision to veto the legislation, the CHP was not interested and did not have any intent or means of blocking such legislation. He further claimed that the government had expected the president to comply with them as a result of supporting his election and denied the claims that the president's staff had been influenced by the CHP.

Hasan Fehmi Güneş

Hasan Fehmi Güneş's campaign focused mainly on the failures of both Baykal and Öymen, claiming that neither leader had been able to create policies or a strong leadership. He accused the former leaders of 'portraying' an aura of progress and also attempting to shift the party to the right. Expressing his view that the CHP was Turkey's biggest and most organised party, he claimed that rather than having a convention, the party should have been preparing for a highly expected early general election. Güneş stated that the leadership election was not simply an election for the party leader, but also a referendum on whether 8.7% (the CHP's vote share in the 1999 general election) was an appropriate election result. Güneş proposed to make the party the 'left's biggest party' in Turkey. Güneş also referred to Öymen's 15 month leadership as '15 months of waste'.

Sefa Sirmen

Sefa Sirmen was the municipal mayor of İzmit when he announced his candidacy for the leadership. His arrival at the convention was met with substantial applause.

Hurşit Güneş

Hurşit Güneş initially expressed an intention to stand for the election, but withdrew after the other candidates were finalised. Güneş claimed that the convention would not have a positive impact the party and did not see the leadership race as meaningful.

Election results

Party council election results

Of the 60 council members elected, 42 were backed by Deniz Baykal while the remaining 18 were backed by either Altan Öymen or Hasan Fehmi Güneş. The members elected to the council, along with the number of votes they received, are shown below.

High Disciplinary Board election results
15 members were elected to the High Disciplinary Board. The elected members and the number of votes they received are as follows.

Party leadership election results
The party leadership election was held in three rounds, with a new round being called if no candidate was able to win more than 521 votes.

References
http://arsiv.ntv.com.tr/news/33780.asp

Extraordinary Conventions of the Republican People's Party (Turkey)
2000 conferences